Caterpillars (larvae) of Lepidoptera species (i.e. of butterflies and moths) are mostly (though not exclusively) herbivores, often oligophagous, i.e. feeding on a narrow variety of plant species (mostly on their leaves, but sometimes on fruit or other parts). 

Lepidopteran larvae often require specific species of food plants.  It also makes some of them important pests in agriculture or forestry. The host plants have yet to be determined for some species. There is not always consensus among lepidopterists over the listing of suitable plants.

Adult females normally lay their eggs on or near specific food plants (which often have to be abundant enough). Lepidopteran larvae can often be raised on a variety food plants and commercial mixtures. Closely related Lepidoptera tend to have similar food plant preferences. Many caterpillars sequester the toxins from their food plants and use them as a defense against predators. Though it is common for Lepidoptera to prefer a certain plant genus or family, some species feed on a narrow selection of unrelated taxa. The choice is unrelated to nectar plant preferences of adult Lepidoptera, which are much less strict.

Lists
 List of Lepidoptera that feed on Abelia
 List of Lepidoptera that feed on Achillea
 List of Lepidoptera that feed on alders
 List of Lepidoptera that feed on Artemisia
 List of Lepidoptera that feed on ashes
 List of Lepidoptera that feed on Aster
 List of Lepidoptera that feed on Atriplex
 List of Lepidoptera that feed on beeches
 List of Lepidoptera that feed on beets
 List of Lepidoptera that feed on birches
 List of Lepidoptera that feed on Brassica
 List of Lepidoptera that feed on brooms
 List of Lepidoptera that feed on buckthorns
 List of Lepidoptera that feed on Buddleja
 List of Lepidoptera that feed on Calluna
 List of Lepidoptera that feed on Camellia
 List of Lepidoptera that feed on Centaurea
 List of Lepidoptera that feed on Chenopodium
 List of Lepidoptera that feed on chestnut trees
 List of Lepidoptera that feed on chrysanthemums
 List of Lepidoptera that feed on Cirsium
 List of Lepidoptera that feed on clovers
 List of Lepidoptera that feed on cotton plants
 List of Lepidoptera that feed on currants
 List of Lepidoptera that feed on dandelions
 List of Lepidoptera that feed on elms
 List of Lepidoptera that feed on Eucalyptus
 List of Lepidoptera that feed on Galium
 List of Lepidoptera that feed on goldenrods
 List of Lepidoptera that feed on grapevines
 List of Lepidoptera that feed on grasses
 List of Lepidoptera that feed on hawthorns
 List of Lepidoptera that feed on hazels
 List of Lepidoptera that feed on Helianthus
 List of Lepidoptera that feed on honeysuckles
 List of Lepidoptera that feed on Ipomoea
 List of Lepidoptera that feed on Juncus
 List of Lepidoptera that feed on larches
 List of Lepidoptera that feed on lettuces
 List of Lepidoptera that feed on Lotus
 List of Lepidoptera that feed on Malus
 List of Lepidoptera that feed on maples
 List of Lepidoptera that feed on oaks
 List of Lepidoptera that feed on pear trees
 List of Lepidoptera that feed on pines
 List of Lepidoptera that feed on plantains
 List of Lepidoptera that feed on Polygonum
 List of Lepidoptera that feed on poplars
 List of Lepidoptera that feed on Potentilla
 List of Lepidoptera that feed on Prunus
 List of Lepidoptera that feed on ragweeds
 List of Lepidoptera that feed on rhododendrons
 List of Lepidoptera that feed on roses
 List of Lepidoptera that feed on Rubus
 List of Lepidoptera that feed on Rumex
 List of Lepidoptera that feed on Senecio
 List of Lepidoptera that feed on Silene
 List of Lepidoptera that feed on Solanum
 List of Lepidoptera that feed on Sorbus
 List of Lepidoptera that feed on spruces
 List of Lepidoptera that feed on strawberry plants
 List of Lepidoptera that feed on Tilia
 List of Lepidoptera that feed on Vaccinium
 List of Lepidoptera that feed on Viburnum
 List of Lepidoptera that feed on willows

External links
HOSTS - a Database of the World's Lepidopteran Hostplants. By Gaden S. Robinson, Phillip R. Ackery, Ian J. Kitching, George W. Beccaloni and Luis M. Hernández @ Natural History Museum, London.
Larval food plant information sorted by plant. Compiled by Markku Savela.

References

 Larval
Lepidopterology
Lists of plants